Cooper County is one of the 141 Cadastral divisions of New South Wales. It contains the town of Barellan.  The Murrumbidgee River is the southern boundary.

Cooper County was named in honour of the merchant and philanthropist Sir Daniel Cooper (1821-1902).

Parishes within this county

A full list of parishes found within this county; their current LGA and mapping coordinates to the approximate centre of each location is as follows:

References

Counties of New South Wales